The 12th Army (German: 12. Armee) was a World War II field army of the Wehrmacht.

History
The 12th Army was activated on October 13, 1939, with General Wilhelm List in command. First seeing defensive action along the Siegfried Line, the army was involved in the invasion and occupation of France. The army was then relocated to Romania as part of the Axis offensive in the Balkans.

In February 1941, an agreement between Field Marshal List and the Bulgarian General Staff allowed the passage of German troops. On the night of February 28, German Army units crossed the Danube from Romania and took up strategic positions in Bulgaria.

On 6 April, units of the 12th army advanced into Yugoslavia and Greece. The Yugoslavians crumbled first. But, after six months of fighting the Italians, the Greeks could not stand up to the 12th Army's fifteen divisions, four of which were armored.

The British subsequently rushed four divisions from Libya to aid the Greeks but they, like the Greeks, were overwhelmed by the German panzers and by Luftwaffe strikes. The northern Greek armies surrendered to the Germans on April 23. Four days later German tanks entered Athens and hoisted the swastika over the Acropolis.

The 12th Army became Army Group E (Heeresgruppe E) on January 1, 1943.

The 12th Army was reconstituted on the Western Front near the Elbe River on April 10, 1945. Under General Walther Wenck, the 12th Army made the last attempt by a German Army to relieve German Führer Adolf Hitler in the besieged German capital during the Battle of Berlin. Although it successfully reached Potsdam, the 12th Army was stopped by numerically superior Soviet Red Army forces and forced to abandon the effort to relieve Berlin. The 12th Army then linked up with the remnants of General Theodor Busse's decimated 9th Army south of Beelitz and, in the confusion of the Soviet breakthrough, provided a corridor to the west for soldiers and refugees alike to reach and cross the partially destroyed Elbe River bridge at Tangermünde and surrender to American forces between May 4 and May 7, 1945.

Commanders

See also
 12th Army (German Empire) for the equivalent formation in World War I
 Invasion of Yugoslavia
 Battle of Greece
 Battle of Berlin

References

12
Military units and formations established in 1939
Military units and formations disestablished in 1943
Military units and formations established in 1945
Military units and formations disestablished in 1945